Christian Manrique Díaz (born 2 October 1998) is a Spanish professional footballer who played for Hungarian club Debrecen as a left back.

Club career
Born in Móstoles, Manrique graduated from the youth academy of Rayo Vallecano and was promoted to the B-team on 15 June 2017. On 28 August, he made his debut, coming on as a substitute for Victor Villacañas in a 2−1 defeat against CF Trival Valderas. On 17 December, he scored his first goal for the team in a 3−0 victory against CD San Fernando de Henares.

On 11 July 2018, Manrique moved abroad and joined Cypriot First Division club AC Omonia. On 16 September, he made his debut for the club, coming on as a last minute substitute for Jaílson in a 1−0 win against Enosis Neon Paralimni FC.

On 1 June 2022, Manrique signed a contract with Debrecen in Hungary for two years with an option for a third.

International career
Manrique has been capped by Spain at under-19 level.

Career statistics

Club

References

External links
AC Omonia profile

1998 births
People from Móstoles
Footballers from the Community of Madrid
Spanish people of Cuban descent
Living people
Association football defenders
Spanish footballers
Spain youth international footballers
Rayo Vallecano B players
AC Omonia players
Olympiakos Nicosia players
Debreceni VSC players
Tercera División players
Cypriot First Division players
Nemzeti Bajnokság I players
Spanish expatriate footballers
Expatriate footballers in Cyprus
Spanish expatriate sportspeople in Cyprus
Expatriate footballers in Hungary
Spanish expatriate sportspeople in Hungary